The 902nd Military Intelligence Group was a brigade-sized unit of the United States Army, under the command of the United States Army Intelligence and Security Command, with an role on counterintelligence. The unit is headquartered at Fort Meade, Maryland.

History
Last commanded by Col. Maria C. Borbon, who participated in its inactivation ceremony, the 902nd MI Group, then known as the Counterintelligence Corps, was first activated on November 23, 1944.

On June 30, 1974, the unit was reassigned to the U.S. Army Intelligence Agency and given a new mission of providing counterintelligence coverage to the eastern part of the United States. In 1977, the unit was part of the largest restructuring of Army Intelligence since the end of World War II. Assigned to the newly established U.S. Army Intelligence and Security Command, the 902nd Military Intelligence (MI) Group was charged with bringing counterintelligence and communications security functions together in a mission, becoming the Army’s principal shield against foreign intelligence services and simultaneously protecting forces in the U.S. before deployments.

The 902nd MI Group responded to the Global War on Terrorism by further providing tactical support to the warfighter. In support of deployed forces, the unit tailored a tactical counterintelligence deployment package that gave both theater commanders and their supporting military intelligence brigades a dedicated counterintelligence capability.

The U.S. Army recently celebrated the activation of the new Army Counterintelligence Command with a ceremony at the command's headquarters on July 28, 2022. The command's activation, directed by Army senior leadership to ensure Army counterintelligence is aligned with protecting Army and Department of Defense modernization efforts, resulted in the inactivation of the 902nd Military Intelligence Group in a ceremony held earlier that day.

Functions of Intelligence

The responsibilities of the 902nd Military Intelligence (MI) Group are to conduct proactive counterintelligence activities to detect, identify, assess, counter, neutralize, or exploit foreign intelligence entities and insider threats to protect the Army and Department of Defense forces, information, and technology worldwide against foreign intelligence entities and insider threats.

The 902nd Military Intelligence Group provides direct and general counterintelligence support to Army activities and significant commands. The group also provides general support to other military department counterintelligence and intelligence elements, unified commands, defense agencies and national agency counterintelligence and security activities and organizations.

Subordinate units of the 902nd Military Intelligence Group are as follows:
 902nd Military Intelligence Group
 The Headquarters and Headquarters Detachment (HHD) provides personnel administration, training and logistical support to the Group.
 The 308th Military Intelligence Battalion conducts counterintelligence, counter-terrorist and counterespionage investigations and operations throughout the continental United States. The 308th also operates all of the INSCOM counterintelligence field offices within the continental U.S. which are manned by counterintelligence special agents. These field offices are the public investigative offices to which anyone can go in order to report a counterintelligence/security incident.
 The 310th Military Intelligence Battalion conducts worldwide counterespionage and counterintelligence investigations, counterintelligence operations and multi-discipline counterintelligence technical operations in support of the Army and defense agencies in peace and war.
 The 752nd Military Intelligence Battalion conducts counterintelligence activities to detect, identify, assess and counter, neutralize or exploit foreign intelligence entities, international terrorism and insider threats in order to protect U.S. Army and Defense Department forces, information and technologies worldwide. On order, provides tailored counterintelligence support in support of Army requirements, INSCOM missions and overseas contingency operations.
 The Army Operations Security Detachment (AOSD) conducts external operations security in support of Army units, both CONUS and OCONUS, to advise and assist commanders on threat vulnerabilities to their static base operations, training exercises and operational deployments.
 The Army Counterintelligence Center (ACIC) assesses foreign intelligence entities, and terrorist and cyber threats to deliver current and predictive multi-discipline analysis that enables war-fighters to protect Army forces, facilities, information and technologies worldwide.

The 902nd MI GP was awarded the Army Superior Unit Award.

See also
 United States Army Counterintelligence
 Battlefield Surveillance Brigade

References

External links and sources
 902nd Military Intelligence Group homepage
 US Army Intelligence and Security Command home page

Group 902